Tuell is a surname. Notable people with the surname include:

Fanny Tuell, a.k.a. Faye Adams, (born 1923), American singer 
Jack Tuell (1923–2014), American Methodist minister and equal-rights advocate

See also
Tuel